Michael Wayne Anthony Ebanks (born 2 October 1964) is an English former footballer who played at right-back for West Bromwich Albion, Stoke City, Port Vale and Cambridge United between 1981 and 1987. He helped Port Vale to win promotion out of the Fourth Division in 1985–86. He later became a police officer.

Career
Ebanks began his career at West Bromwich Albion, and played seven First Division games for the "Baggies" in the 1983–84 season under the stewardship of Ron Wylie and Johnny Giles. He then fell lout of the first team picture at The Hawthorns, and was loaned out to Bill Asprey's Stoke City, playing ten First Division and two cup games for the "Potters" in the disastrous 1984–85 season. After leaving the Victoria Ground, he returned to Stoke-on-Trent in March 1985, this time on loan to rivals Port Vale. He featured eleven times in the Fourth Division for the "Valiants", and impressed manager John Rudge enough to win permanent transfer in June 1985. He featured 15 times as Vale won promotion to the Third Division in the 1985–86 season, and then played 22 games in the 1986–87 campaign. He was given a free transfer in May 1987, and joined Cambridge United on a non-contract basis. He cut his time at the Abbey Stadium short to join the police force.

Post-retirement
After leaving the game Ebanks joined the police force.

Career statistics
Source:

A.  The "Other" column constitutes appearances and goals in the Football League Trophy.

Honours
Port Vale
Football League Fourth Division fourth-place promotion: 1985–86

References

1964 births
Living people
Footballers from Birmingham, West Midlands
English footballers
Black British sportsmen
Association football fullbacks
West Bromwich Albion F.C. players
Stoke City F.C. players
Port Vale F.C. players
Cambridge United F.C. players
English Football League players
British police officers